Stark Ridge is a narrow ridge that extends from the east part of Hunt Mountain, Churchill Mountains, and trends north for 11 nautical miles (20 km) to the sharp north-northeast turn in Starshot Glacier. Several summits rise from the ridge which separates Sivjee Glacier and Mansergh Snowfield. Named by Advisory Committee on Antarctic Names (US-ACAN) after Antony A. Stark, Smithsonian Astrophysical Observatory, Cambridge, MA; United States Antarctic Program (USAP) principal investigator for the Antarctic submillimeter telescope and remote observatory at the South Pole, 1991–2002.

Ridges of Oates Land